The canton of Le Chesnay-Rocquencourt (before 2021: Le Chesnay) is an administrative division of the Yvelines department, northern France. Its borders were modified at the French canton reorganisation which came into effect in March 2015. Its seat is in Le Chesnay-Rocquencourt.

It consists of the following communes:
Bailly
Bougival
La Celle-Saint-Cloud
Le Chesnay-Rocquencourt
Louveciennes

References

Cantons of Yvelines